Atgāzene is a neighbourhood of Riga, the capital of Latvia. It is the location of Turība University.

Neighbourhoods in Riga